Marcelo Pereira da Costa  (born 24 July 1980, in Campinas do Sul), is a Brazilian footballer who plays as an attacking midfielder for Paysandu.

Honours
Grêmio
Campeonato Brasileiro Série B: 2005
Campeonato Gaúcho: 2006

Joinville
Campeonato Brasileiro Série B: 2014

 Paysandu
 Campeonato Paraense: 2016
 Copa Verde: 2016

External links

Living people
1980 births
Brazilian footballers
Brazilian expatriate footballers
Expatriate footballers in Portugal
Esporte Clube Juventude players
C.D. Nacional players
Grêmio Foot-Ball Porto Alegrense players
Sociedade Esportiva Palmeiras players
Ipatinga Futebol Clube players
Sociedade Esportiva e Recreativa Caxias do Sul players
Goiás Esporte Clube players
Associação Desportiva São Caetano players
Joinville Esporte Clube players
Paysandu Sport Club players
Association football midfielders